Paul Ryan (born 17 February 1970) is a British biathlete. He competed in the men's 20 km individual event at the 1992 Winter Olympics.

References

External links
 

1970 births
Living people
British male biathletes
Olympic biathletes of Great Britain
Biathletes at the 1992 Winter Olympics
Sportspeople from Wiltshire